Eurosta comma is a species of tephritid or fruit flies in the genus Eurosta of the family Tephritidae.

Distribution
United States.

References

Tephritinae
Insects described in 1830
Diptera of North America